The 1955–56 Iowa State Cyclones men's basketball team represented Iowa State University during the 1955-56 NCAA College men's basketball season. The Cyclones were coached by Bill Strannigan, who was in his second season with the Cyclones. They played their home games at the Iowa State Armory in Ames, Iowa.

They finished the season 18–5, 8–4 in Big Seven play to finish in a tie for second place. They won the Big Seven Holiday Tournament, defeating Kansas State, Colorado and Kansas.

Roster

Schedule and results 

|-
!colspan=6 style=""|Regular Season

|-

References 

Iowa State Cyclones men's basketball seasons
Iowa State
Iowa State Cyc
Iowa State Cyc